A Wife from Paris (translit. Zawga Mn Paris) is a 1966 Egyptian romantic comedy film directed by Atef Salem.

Cast
 Salah Zulfikar as Dr. Wagih
 Roushdy Abaza as Nagi
 Fouad El Mohandes as Daoud
 Nabila Ebeid as Samia

See also
 Cinema of Egypt
 Lists of Egyptian films
 Salah Zulfikar filmography
 List of Egyptian films of 1966
 List of Egyptian films of the 1960s

References

External links
 
 A Wife from Paris on elcinema.com
 A Wife from Paris on Dhliz.com

1960s Arabic-language films
1966 films
1966 romantic comedy films
Egyptian romantic comedy films
Films shot in Egypt